Cando (parish of San Tirso) is a village in northwestern Spain, in Outes, province of A Coruña, and the region of Galicia, with a population of around 1000.

It was the location of the observation of a fireball in early 1994, and the subsequent discovery of an explosion site (crater), which has been interpreted by some as being related to UFO activity.

See also 
 List of meteor air bursts
  Bólido de Cando on the Spanish Wikipedia

References 

Province of A Coruña